The Toyota iQ is a city car manufactured by Toyota and marketed in a single generation for Japan (2008–2016); Europe (2008–2015); and North America (2012–2015), where it was marketed as the Scion iQ. A rebadged variant was marketed in Europe as the Aston Martin Cygnet (2009–2013).

Designed at the Toyota European Design and Development studio in Nice, France, the iQ is noted for its specialized engineering to maximize passenger space and minimize length. The design accommodates four occupants, although one of the seats has very little legroom and is not suitable for adults.

Following a concept presented at the 2007 Frankfurt Motor Show, the production iQ debuted at the March 2008 Geneva Motor Show. Japanese sales began in November 2008 and European sales in January 2009. In 2008, the iQ was named the Japanese Car of the Year.

The name iQ, an initialism of the term intelligence quotient, recalls a competitor, the Smart Fortwo. The letters "iQ" also stand for "individuality", "innovation", "quality", a hint at its "cubic form" and also a "cue" for owners to embrace new types of vehicles and lifestyles.

The iQ reached the end of production in December 2015, and it was discontinued in Japan in April 2016.

Overview 

The IQ design emphasizes fuel efficiency, maneuverability, low environmental impact, and interior space. Six design factors enable the minimal overhangs, forward windscreen location, maximized cabin space and overall compactness:
 A newly developed differential mounted further forward than usual
 A centre take-off steering gear
 A flat fuel tank positioned underneath the cabin floor
 Rear-angled shock absorbers to encroach less on rear passenger space
 A smaller heater/air conditioning unit mounted centrally behind the asymmetric dashboard
 A slimmer seat design.

The iQ features a transmissions differential housing located ahead of, rather than behind, the engine; a starter motor incorporated in the engine's flywheel, a high-mounted steering rack and a compact, high-located air conditioning unit behind the dashboard central area. The arrangement allows the front passenger to sit forward of the driver, giving increased rear passenger legroom. A shallow under-floor fuel tank reduces rear overhang.

Because of its overall width and engine displacement, the iQ is classified in its home market as a supermini, though its length complies with kei car dimensional regulations.

European sales of the iQ peaked at 44,282 in 2009, and then gradually decreased to less than a thousand in 2015.

Production of the Scion iQ EV (Toyota eQ in Japan) was to be limited to 100 units for special fleet use in Japan and carsharing demonstration projects in the U.S. Deliveries of the all-electric version with a range of  began in the U.S. in March 2013.

Details

Model codes
Toyota internally designated the iQ as the AJ10, with further sub-model chassis codes:

The two seat variant was marketed solely in Japan.

Engines

The 1.0L engine is similar to the engine in Toyota Aygo. The iQ achieves  by European standards. UK models include only petrol engines.

Early Japanese models include only 1.0L three-cylinder engine. 1.33L engine option was added beginning in 2009. Models with the 1.33L engine include start and stop system, however, only with the manual transmission.

The car is capable of fitting 1.6L four-cylinder engine.

Transmissions

Japanese models include only CVT transmission.

Specifications

Safety
The iQ includes nine airbags, dual frontal airbags, front seat-mounted side torso airbags, side curtain airbags, front passenger seat cushion airbag, a driver's knee airbag and a newly developed rear curtain airbag to protect backseat passengers' heads from rear-end collisions. Vehicle Stability Control, traction control, anti-lock brakes, brake assist, and electronic brakeforce distribution come standard.

In 2013, the UK's Vehicle and Operator Services Agency voted the Toyota iQ as top three-year-old car most likely to pass its first Ministry of Transport road worthiness test.

Scion iQ

In the United States and Canada, the iQ was marketed under Scion, then Toyota's small car brand in that market. The car was introduced in 2012 and discontinued with its Toyota counterpart in 2015. The production Scion iQ debuted at the 2010 New York Auto Show and was marketed for model years 2012 to 2015. In North America, the iQ was only available with the 1.3 L 1NR-FE engine paired to a CVT automatic.

Toyota eQ/Scion iQ EV

A prototype of the Toyota eQ (Scion iQ EV in the US) was exhibited at the 2011 Geneva Motor Show. The Scion iQ EV is the successor to the FT-EV II as an electric vehicle based on the Toyota iQ chassis. Toyota produced three generations of FT-EV concept cars, and the iQ EV is a production version of those concepts, incorporating the technological and design strengths of all three models. The exterior of the production version is based on the FT-EV III concept shown at the 2011 Tokyo Motor Show.

The U.S. launch of the limited-production Scion iQ EV was announced for 2012, and according to Toyota, for the initial roll-out the iQ EV would not be available to individual consumers, instead the carmaker decided to focus on fleet customers and car sharing programs. The iQ EV was scheduled to be produced at Toyota's Takaoka Plant in Toyota City beginning in August 2012 and the initial production was planned to be limited to 600 units, with 400 staying in Japan, 100 units destined to the U.S. and the other 100 for Europe. In September 2012 Toyota announced that due to customers' concerns about range and charging time, the production of the Scion iQ (Toyota eQ in Japan) will be limited to 100 units for special fleet use in Japan and the U.S. only, of which, 90 will be placed in American carsharing demonstration projects. The iQ EV/eQ was scheduled to be released in both countries in December 2012.

The first 30 units were delivered in the U.S. to the University of California, Irvine in March 2013 for use in its Zero Emission Vehicle-Network Enabled Transport (ZEV-NET) carsharing fleet. Since 2002 the ZEV-NET program has been serving the transport needs of the Irvine community with all-electric vehicles for the critical last mile of commutes from the Irvine train station to the UC campus and local business offices. In September 2013, another 30 units were allocated to City Carshare to operate Dash, a three-year pilot carsharing program in Hacienda Business Park, in Pleasanton, California.

Specifications 

Designed as a city commuting vehicle, the iQ EV has a lower battery capacity that also translates into a shorter charging time, allowing the car to be fully recharged in approximately three hours, and using fast charging, the battery can be recharged up to 80% capacity in only 15 minutes. Like other Toyota full hybrid vehicles, the iQ EV is equipped with a regenerative braking system.

High tensile sheet steel has been extensively used in the body shell construction to minimize the additional weight caused by the lithium-ion battery pack, and as a result, the iQ EV weighs just  more than a standard 1.3L CVT iQ.

Fuel economy 
The U. S. Environmental Protection Agency rated the 2013 iQ EV with a combined fuel economy of 121 miles per gallon gasoline equivalent (MPG-e) with an energy consumption of 28 kW-hrs/100 miles. The city rating is 138 MPG-e with an energy consumption of 24 kW-hrs/100 miles and 105 MPG-e with an energy consumption of 32 kW-hrs/100 miles for highway driving.
, these ratings allow the 2013 iQ EV to be the second most fuel efficient EPA-certified vehicle of all fuel types considered in all years behind the BMW i3. The iQ EV was ranked first in DOE-EPA's 2013 Annual Fuel Economy Guide.

Aston Martin Cygnet 
The Aston Martin Cygnet is a rebadged variant of the Toyota/Scion iQ marketed by Aston Martin beginning with model year 2011, allowing Aston Martin to comply with the 2012 European Union-imposed fleet average emissions regulations. It was developed under the codename P298.

The Cygnet was initially only marketed in the UK. Sales commenced in January 2011 and the market coverage was expanded to cover other European countries the following year. Sales were not restricted, but demand from existing Aston Martin owners for Cygnet was  expected to take priority initially. Aston Martin CEO Ulrich Bez announced shipping expectations of about 4000 per year at a price of about £30,000 – about three times as much as the iQ. Bez stated that the Cygnet demonstrated the company's "commitment to innovation and integrity", whilst respecting the need to "satisfy demands of emissions and space".

In September 2013, after just over two years of production, Aston Martin announced that it would stop production of the Cygnet. The Cygnet has been the second shortest running production car in the history of Aston Martin after the 2012 Aston Martin Virage, which was only produced for a year. The Cygnet was cancelled due to disastrously low sales, with the car reaching only 150 units in the UK (approximately 300 in total) rather than its annual target of 4000.

In June 2018, Aston Martin announced a one-off 4.7-litre  V8 edition of the Cygnet for a customer. It uses the engine, transmission, suspension, brakes and wheels from the Aston Martin Vantage S. New subframes and wheel arches were made to combine the body and mechanicals.

Singulato iC3

At the 2019 Auto Shanghai show, Chinese electric vehicle brand Singulato showed off its second production car, the iC3. The iC3 was created through negotiations with Toyota in order to use the platform and basic design of the iQ. In return Toyota is allowed to use the Green Vehicle Credits produced by Singulato in China. The iC3 differs in design from the iQ in both the front and rear fascias.

Concept cars

Toyota iQ Concept (2007)
Was initially unveiled at the 2007 Frankfurt Motor Show.

Toyota FT-EV (2009)

The Toyota FT-EV concept was unveiled at the January 2009 North American International Auto Show. Toyota planned to launch the production version of FT-EV in 2012.

Toyota FT-EV II (2009)
The Toyota FT-EV II was first shown at the October 2009 Tokyo Motor Show. It has a unique design compared to the FT-EV, with a transparent body and electrically operated sliding doors. A pair of linked joysticks (each joystick duplicating the other) control acceleration, braking and steering using drive-by-wire.

Toyota iQ Customize Car (2009–)
This is a family of Toyota iQ custom body kits in Japanese market.

MODELLISTA MAXI includes custom front bumper, side skirt, rear bumper. MODELLISTA MIXTURE includes custom B-pillar shadow, mirror cover, back window panel, side door trim. MODELLISTA MIXTURE side make set only includes custom mirror cover and side door trim.

Toyota iQ "Gazoo Racing tuned by MN" (130G, 2009)
This is a limited (100 units) version for Japanese market.

The Gazoo Racing package adds a front bumper spoiler, side mudguards, rear bumper spoiler centre muffler, Toyota front fog lamps, original decal, front sport seat covers.

The vehicle was unveiled at the January 2009 Tokyo Auto Salon.

The Gazoo Racing cars were sold through Toyota's Netz dealer channel. It has MSRP of ¥1,972,000 (¥1,878,095+tax).

Scion iQ Concept (2009)
The Scion iQ Concept car was built by Five Axis (California, USA) based on the Toyota iQ and displayed in April 2009 at the New York Auto Show. It was also shown at the 2009 Frankfurt Motor Show as the Toyota iQ for Sports concept.

Toyota iQ Collection (2009)
Unveiled at the 2009 Frankfurt Motor Show with the iQ for Sports, the Toyota iQ Collection had a transparent acrylic roof, looking similar to the initial 2007 concept, and a custom interior.

GRMN iQ Racing Concept (2011)
The GRMN iQ Racing Concept was based on Toyota iQ "Gazoo Racing tuned by MN" car sold in 2009, but was equipped with a supercharger and roll cage.

The vehicle was unveiled at the 2011 Tokyo Auto Salon.

GRMN iQ Supercharger (2012)
It is a limited (100 units) version of Toyota iQ for Japanese market, based on the Toyota iQ 130G MT. It included the supercharger found in the GRMN iQ Racing Concept car.

The prototype vehicle was unveiled at the 2012 Tokyo Auto Salon.

Toyota FT-EV III
Was shown as the 2011 Tokyo Motor Show, see below.

Sales

References

External links

 
 Aston Martin Cygnet
 Toyota IQ Australian press release
 Gazoo Racing iQ 

 
IQ
Green vehicles
Front-wheel-drive vehicles
Cars introduced in 2008
City cars
Electric car models
2010s cars